Bix Beiderbecke (1903 – 1931) was an American jazz musician.

Bix may also refer to:

In art and entertainment:
 Bix (film), a 1991 Italian film about Beiderbecke
 Bix (rock group), a Lithuanian rock group
 Bix (website), a defunct contest website owned by Yahoo!
 Annual events named for Beiderbecke in Davenport, Iowa
 Bix 7 Road Race
 Bix Beiderbecke Memorial Jazz Festival
 Bix Barton, a fictional comic book character featured in the British science fiction anthology magazine 2000 AD
 Bix, a fictional Protoceratops in the Dinotopia books by James Gurney

In other uses:
 Bix, Oxfordshire, a village in Oxfordshire, England
 BIX, a telephony cross-connect system created in the 1970s by Nortel Networks
 Byte Information Exchange (BIX), a mid-1980s commercial online service offered by Byte magazine
 Herbert P. Bix, American historian and writer
 Hermann Bix (1914–1986), German World War II panzer commander